Oklahoma Private School Association (OPSA) is an organization of proprietary postsecondary schools and colleges dedicated to a higher quality of education for Oklahoma's technical and vocational workforce. Training at OPSA schools include computer technology, computer programming, medical assistant, LPN, surgical technician, dental hygiene, medical billing and coding, computerized accounting, transcription, court reporting, electrical, heating and air conditioning, just to name a few.

In 2005 there were 42 accredited proprietary postsecondary schools and colleges in Oklahoma that employed 1,179 staff and faculty and produced 5,646 graduates.  A recent study by Imagine America estimates career schools in Oklahoma contribute $108 million yearly to the Oklahoma economy.

Almost all of OPSA member schools are in either Tulsa or Oklahoma City, Oklahoma's two largest cities.  In Oklahoma City, member schools include Platt College, Oklahoma Technical Institute, Vatterott College, Heritage College, ITT, Oklahoma Health Academy, ATI, and University of Phoenix.  In Tulsa, member schools include Community Care College, Platt College, Oklahoma Health Academy, American Institute of Medical Technology, and University of Phoenix.

Dr. Paul Shuler, Oklahoma Technology Institute, has been the President of OPSA since 2005.  Jerry McGinnis, Oklahoma College of Construction, is the immediate Past President.

External links

United States schools associations
Education in Oklahoma
Vocational education in Oklahoma